Alexander is an unincorporated community in Burke County, in the U.S. state of Georgia.

History
A post office called Alexander was established in 1847, and remained in operation until 1966. The community was named after Hugh Alexander, a pioneer settler. Alexander was an incorporated municipality from 1851 until 1995.

References

Unincorporated communities in Burke County, Georgia
Unincorporated communities in Georgia (U.S. state)